Alexandr Kulikovskiy (born 2 January 1997) is a Russian cyclist, who most recently rode for UCI ProTeam .

Major results
2014
 2nd Junior World Road Race Championships
2015
 1st Stage 1 Peace Race Juniors
2016
 1st Minsk Cup
 1st Trofeo Almar
 1st Stage 1 Baltic Chain Tour
 4th Grand Prix Minsk
2017
 2nd Under-23 National Road Race Championships
 6th Grand Prix Minsk
2018
 7th Trofeo Alcide Degasperi
 7th Coppa della Pace

References

External links

1997 births
Living people
Russian male cyclists